La Gravelle is a commune in the Mayenne department in north-western France.

Geography
The river Oudon has its source in the commune.

See also
Communes of the Mayenne department

References

Gravelle